Jules Gales (13 July 1924 – 26 May 1988) was a Luxembourgian footballer. He competed at the 1948 Summer Olympics and the 1952 Summer Olympics.

References

External links
 
 

1924 births
1988 deaths
Luxembourgian footballers
Luxembourg international footballers
Olympic footballers of Luxembourg
Footballers at the 1948 Summer Olympics
Footballers at the 1952 Summer Olympics
People from Remich (canton)
Association football midfielders
CA Spora Luxembourg players
Luxembourg National Division players